Enrico Santoro (born 18 September 1932) was an Italian politician who served as Mayor of Isernia (1965–1972) and President of Molise (1990–1992).

References

1932 births
Living people
Mayors of Isernia
Presidents of Molise
20th-century Italian politicians
Christian Democracy (Italy) politicians